Jørn Peter Snogdahl (1 October 1922 – 1 July 2012) was a Danish rower.

Snogdahl was born in 1922 in Copenhagen. He was the elder brother to Mogens Snogdahl.

He competed at the 1948 Summer Olympics in London with Søren Jensen in the men's coxless pair where they were eliminated in the semi-finals.

References

1922 births
2012 deaths
Danish male rowers
Olympic rowers of Denmark
Rowers at the 1948 Summer Olympics
Rowers from Copenhagen
Rowers at the 1952 Summer Olympics
European Rowing Championships medalists